Slovakia competes at the 2009 World Championships in Athletics from 15 to 23 August in Berlin.

References

External links
Official competition website

Nations at the 2009 World Championships in Athletics
World Championships in Athletics
Slovakia at the World Championships in Athletics